Raúl García Lozano (born 11 September 1980 in Oviedo, Asturias) is a Spanish former footballer who played as a central defender.

External links

1980 births
Living people
Footballers from Oviedo
Spanish footballers
Association football defenders
La Liga players
Segunda División players
Segunda División B players
Tercera División players
Real Oviedo Vetusta players
Real Oviedo players
Racing de Ferrol footballers
CD Toledo players
CD Logroñés footballers
CD Mirandés footballers
Marino de Luanco footballers
SK Austria Klagenfurt players
Spanish expatriate footballers
Expatriate footballers in Austria
Spanish expatriate sportspeople in Austria